Desan (died 355AD) was a bishop of the Christian Church.

He was a resident of Bizabda in Mesopotamia during the reign of Shapur II. He refused to turn away from the Christian faith and was on that basis transported to Persia where he was killed in 355. He was accompanied in martyrdom by a number of others, including: Heliodorus, another Christian bishop; Marjab, a Christian priest; Abdjesus, and 270 others.

They are all collectively commemorated with a feast day on April 9.

References

Sources
Holweck, F. G. A Biographical Dictionary of the Saints. St. Louis, MO: B. Herder Book Co., 1924.

Year of birth missing
355 deaths
4th-century Mesopotamian bishops
4th-century Christian martyrs